Coles is a municipality in the Spanish province of Ourense. It has a population of 3150 (2014) and an area of 38 km².

References  

Municipalities in the Province of Ourense